Sabah State Legislative Assembly building is the current state legislative complex for the state of Sabah, Malaysia. This is the venue where all the elected state assemblymen from Sabah would convene a meeting in order to debate state government policies and pass laws.

History

The building was opened in June 1995. It is located 8 km from Kota Kinabalu city centre on a hilltop overlooking Tanjung Lipat, an area where major state and federal government offices and institutions are concentrated.

Structure

The building footprint itself occupies 2 hectares within a land area of 11 hectares. It has four storeys, and the administration office is located on the 4th floor.

Floor directory

The state assembly building is equipped with the following facilities in each floor:

See also
 Sabah State Legislative Assembly
 Wisma Innoprise
 Tun Mustapha Tower

References

Buildings and structures in Kota Kinabalu
State secretariat buildings in Malaysia
Sabah State Legislative Assembly